The Guys Choice (formerly known as Spike Guys Choice Awards) is an awards show produced by the Viacom cable channel Spike from 2007 to 2016. The winners were originally chosen based on voting by fans and viewers of the channel until 2015, when the show started presenting the honorees.

The trophy for the award is a golden pair of antlers on a wooden pedestal, which is to symbolize the stag.

Categories
Categories vary from year to year. Examples of categories awarded more than twice include "Guy of the Year," "Jean-Claude Gahd Dam," "Biggest Ass Kicker," "Decade of Hotness," "Funniest M.F.," "Guy Movie Hall of Fame," "Guy Movie of the Year," and "Most Unstoppable Jock."

Slightly different variants of the category "Hottest (Insert Girl's Name)" also tend to recur year over year.

2000s

2007 Awards
The 2007 Guys' Choice Awards were held June 9, 2007 at CBS Studio Center in Los Angeles, California while the television premiere aired June 13, 2007. It was hosted by Tracy Morgan, who wore an ankle monitor during the ceremony.  The show featured performances by Carmen Electra and Tricia Helfer, ZZ Top and appearances by Will Ferrell and Adam Sandler, who won the Guy's Guy award, voted for by Spike viewers. Jon Favreau and Vince Vaughn were also present to accept the Guy Movie Hall of Fame Award for their cult bachelor movie Swingers.

Minka Kelly was reported in Men's Fitness magazine to have been excited when she won her award, declaring "Anyone can win an Emmy, but not everyone can say they've won an award from the network responsible for Ultimate Fighter 5 and Late Night Strip."

Guy Movie Hall of Fame: Swingers
Biggest Ass Kicker: Gerard Butler in 300 vs Kiefer Sutherland in 24
Ballsiest Band: Lamb of God vs Disturbed
Hottest Girl on the Planet: Beyoncé vs Adriana Lima
Luckiest Bastard: Cash Warren (in recognition of his relationship with Jessica Alba) vs Dominic Monaghan (in recognition of his relationship with Evangeline Lilly)
Funniest M.F.: Will Ferrell vs Sacha Baron Cohen
Gift from the Gods: Minka Kelly (Friday Night Lights) vs Rashida Jones (The Office)
Most Unstoppable Jock: Kobe Bryant vs LaDainian Tomlinson
Naughtiest Cybervixen: Christine Dolce
Most Dangerous Man: Chuck Liddell vs Dog the Bounty Hunter
Femme Fatale: Tricia Helfer (Battlestar Galactica) vs Rose McGowan (Grindhouse)
Kingpin (Guy of the Year): James Gandolfini vs George Clooney
Cockiest Crew: Entourage Crew vs Jackass 2 CrewGutsiest Move: Stephen Colbert (in recognition of his hosting of the 2006 White House Correspondents' Dinner) vs Chris Petersen (Boise State Head Coach)
Sickest Rhymes: Jay-Z vs Nas
Sexiest Import: Bar Refaeli
Coolest Geek: Rainn Wilson (The Office) vs Masi Oka (Heroes)Best Gangstertainment: The Departed vs The Sopranos
Hottest "Jessica": Jessica Alba vs Jessica Biel
Chairman of the Board: Shaun White
Game with the Most Game: Madden NFL 07
Most Viral Video: Will Ferrell The Landlord
Guys Guy: Adam Sandler

2008 Awards
The 2008 Guys Choice Awards were held May 31, 2008 at Sony Pictures Studios in Los Angeles. Hosted by stars John Cho and Kal Penn, the show was aired  on Sunday, June 22.
Guy of the Year: Harrison Ford vs Matt Damon
Alpha Male Award: Hugh Hefner
Brass Balls: Harrison Ford
Biggest Ass Kicker: Jason Bourne vs Iron Man
Hottest Girl on the Planet: Scarlett Johansson vs Jessica Biel
Guy Movie of the Year: Iron Man
Guy Movie Hall of Fame: There's Something About Mary
Most Dangerous Man: Anderson Silva vs Wladimir Klitschko
Decade of Hotness: Cameron Diaz
Funniest M.F.: Steve Carell
Hottest "Eva": Eva Longoria vs Eva Mendes
Most Unstoppable Jock: Eli Manning vs Tiger Woods
Sexiest Siren: Rihanna vs Avril Lavigne
Ballsiest Band: Foo Fighters vs Linkin Park
Sickest Rhymes: 50 Cent vs Kanye West
Next Big Thing: Megan Fox
Hot N' Fresh: Meagan Good vs Marisa Miller
King of Comedy: Seth Rogen vs Chris Rock
Play of the Year: Matt Holliday vs David Tyree
Top Fantasy Leaguer: LeBron James vs Tom Brady
So Hot They're Famous: Kim Kardashian vs Tila Tequila
Femme Fatale: Jessica Simpson vs Ashley Dupré
Badass DNA: Eli Manning and Peyton Manning vs Kurt Busch and Kyle Busch
Hot & Funny: Tina Fey vs Sarah Silverman
Real Sports Miracle: Richard Zedník vs Kevin Everett
Most Viral Video: I'm Fucking Matt Damon vs I'm Fucking Ben Affleck
Hilarious Dot Com Award: Funny or Die vs South Park Studios
Top Literary Achievement: Slash, Slash vs Nikki Sixx, The Heroin Diaries
Fiercest Female: Milla Jovovich (Resident Evil: Extinction) vs Summer Glau (Terminator: The Sarah Connor Chronicles)
Luckiest Bastard: Brian Austin Green (For being engaged to Megan Fox) vs Rhys Ifans (For spooning Sienna Miller)
Killer Quote: "Don't Taze Me, Bro" vs "I Have A Wide Stance"
Foxiest Presidential Groupie: Obama Girl vs Hillary Hottie

2009 Awards
Event was held at Sony Studios on May 30, 2009 and aired June 21, 2009.
 Guy Movie Hall of Fame: Fight Club
 Biggest Ass Kicker: Daniel Craig vs Jason Statham
 Hottest "Mila": Mila Kunis vs Mila Jovovich
 Funniest M.F.: Sacha Baron Cohen
 Hot 'n' Fresh: Malin Åkerman vs Olivia Wilde
 Outstanding Literary Achievement: Russell Brand, My Booky Wook vs Denis Leary, Why We Suck: A Feel Good Guide to Staying Fat, Loud, Lazy and Stupid
 Mankind Award: Judd Apatow
 Guy of the Year: Barack Obama vs Mickey Rourke
 Guitar God Award: Eddie Van Halen
 Decade of Hotness: Halle Berry
 Ballsiest Band: Metallica vs Green Day
 Top Fantasy Leaguer: Drew Brees vs Dwyane Wade
 Brass Balls: Clint Eastwood
 Most Manticipated Movie: Inglourious Basterds
 Deadliest Warrior: Christian Bale as Batman vs Christian Bale as John Connor
 Most Dangerous Man: Manny Pacquiao vs Brock Lesnar
 Hottest Girl on the Planet: Bar Rafaeli vs Megan Fox
 Hottest Twins: Ikki Twins vs The Bella Twins
 Sickest Rhymes: T.I. vs Lil Wayne
 Best Bush: Will Ferrell vs Josh Brolin
 Siren: Beyoncé vs Katy Perry
 Comedy Savant: Jason Segel vs Danny McBride
 Most Unstoppable Jock: Ben Roethlisberger vs LeBron James
 Femme Fatale: Angelina Jolie (Wanted) vs Charlize Theron (Hancock)
 Best Unsupported Role: Kate Winslet (The Reader) vs Marisa Tomei (The Wrestler)
 Sexiest Athlete: Biba Golic vs Allison Stokke
 Play of the Year: Santonio Holmes' winning catch
 Porn Again: Jesse Jane
 Big Men on Campus: Florida Gators

2010s

2010 Awards
Event was held at Sony Studios on June 5, 2010 and aired June 20, 2010.
 Guycon: Sylvester Stallone
 Unstoppable Jock: Drew Brees vs LeBron James
 Holy Grail of Hot: Zoe Saldana vs Jessica Biel
 Guy Movie of the Year: The Hangover
 Outstanding Literary Achievement: Ozzy Osbourne, I Am Ozzy vs Tracy Morgan, "I Am The New Black"
 Decade of Hotness: Charlize Theron
 Most Dangerous Man: Manny Pacquiao vs Georges St-Pierre
 Most Manticipated Movie: Inception
 Hotter Than Hell: Miranda Kerr vs Brooklyn Decker
 Guy Movie Hall of Fame: Goodfellas
 Jean-Claude Gahd Dam: Scarlett Johansson vs Zoe Saldana
 Troops Choice for Entertainer of the Year: Sandra Bullock
 Funniest M.F.: Chris Rock
 Biggest Ass Kicker: Jack Bauer vs Perseus
 Chairman of the Board: Shaun White
 Deadliest Warrior: Robert Downey Jr. as Iron Man vs Robert Downey Jr. as Sherlock Holmes
 Guy of the Year: George Clooney vs Zach Galifianakis
 Top Fantasy Leaguer: Kevin Durant vs Chris Johnson
 Hottest "Olivia": Olivia Wilde vs Olivia Munn
 Hotshot: Danica Patrick vs Lindsey Vonn
 Comedy MVP: Ed Helms vs Tracy Morgan
 Hot and Funny: Kaley Cuoco vs Sofía Vergara
 Ballsiest Band: Stone Temple Pilots

2011 Awards
Event was held at Sony Studios on June 4, 2011 and aired June 10, 2011.
 Funniest M.F.: Jim Carrey
 Decade of Hotness: Jennifer Aniston
 Brass Balls: Keith Richards
 Guy Movie Hall of Fame: Fast Times at Ridgemont High
 Holy Grail of Hot: Minka Kelly vs Mila Kunis
 Guy of the Year: Mark Zuckerberg vs Mark Wahlberg
 Biggest Ass Kicker: Dwayne Johnson vs Mark Wahlberg
 Most Manticipated Movie: Cowboys & Aliens
 Guy Movie of the Year: The Fighter
 Troops Choice for Entertainer of the Year: Ben Affleck
 Most Dangerous Man: Manny Pacquiao vs Jon Jones
 Unstoppable Jock: Aaron Rodgers vs Kobe Bryant
 Our New Girlfriend: Rosie Huntington-Whiteley vs Candice Swanepoel
 Top Fantasy Leaguer: Arian Foster vs Chris Paul
 Comedy MVP: Daniel Tosh vs Danny McBride
 Hot and Funny: Sofía Vergara vs Emma Stone
 Outstanding Literary Achievement: Life by Keith Richards vs A Shore Thing by Nicole "Snooki" Polizzi
 Rookie of the Year: Sam Bradford vs Blake Griffin Best Girl On Girl Scene: Natalie Portman and Mila Kunis – Black Swan Lesbian Scene vs Minka Kelly and Leighton Meester – The Roommate Girl Fight
 "Manvention" of the Year: Christopher Sun (3D Sex and Zen: Extreme Ecstasy)

2012 Awards
Event was held at Sony Studios on June 19, 2012 and aired June 19, 2012. Foxy Shazam served as the house band for the event.
 Guy Movie Hall of Fame: Old School
 Most Manticipated Movie: The Dark Knight Rises
 Troops Choice for Entertainer of the Year: Justin Timberlake
 Funniest M.F.: Seth MacFarlane
 Guycon: Matthew McConaughey
 Choice Baller: Kobe Bryant
 Guys Man: Eric LeGrand
 Brass Balls: Adam Sandler
 Biggest Ass Kicker: Ryan Gosling vs Liam Neeson Most Dangerous Man: Floyd Mayweather Jr. vs Manny Pacquiao
 Holy Grail of Hot: Scarlett Johansson vs Sofía Vergara
 Unstoppable Jock: Eli Manning
 Our New Girlfriend: Kate Upton vs Doutzen Kroes
 Guy of the Year: Brad Pitt vs Louis C.K.
 Top Fantasy Leaguer: Albert Pujols vs Aaron Rodgers Comedy MVP: Louis C.K. vs Will Ferrell Hot and Funny: Emma Stone vs Kristen Wiig
 Outstanding Literary Achievement: Tina Fey, Bossypants vs Dick Cheney, In My Time: A Personal and Political Memoir
 Jean-Claude Gahd Dam: Kate Beckinsale vs Rooney Mara
 Rookie of the Year: Cam Newton vs Kyrie Irving
 Hottest "Zo(o)e(y)": Zooey Deschanel vs Zoe Saldana
 Best Fight Scene: Mark Wahlberg (Contraband) vs Mark Wahlberg (Ted)

2013 Awards
Event was held at Sony Studios on June 8, 2013, and aired on June 12, 2013. The house band for the 2013 show is The Heavy.

 Guy of the Year: Ben Affleck
 Most Manticipated Movie: Man of Steel
 Funniest M.F.: Jimmy Kimmel
 Guycon: Vince Vaughn
 Stand-Up of the Year: Kevin Hart
 Mankind Award: Felix Baumgartner
 The Original Dude: Jeff Bridges
 Virtuoso: Jamie Foxx
 Troops Choice for Entertainment of the Year: Vin Diesel
 Hot and Funny: Kaley Cuoco
 Alpha Male: Burt Reynolds
 Rookie of the Year: Andrew Luck
 Guy Movie of the Year: Ted
 Our New Girlfriend: Katherine Webb vs Chrissy Teigen
 Outstanding Literary Achievement: Willie Nelson, "Roll Me Up and Smoke Me When I Die: Musings from the Road" vs Jeff Bridges and Bernie Glassman, The Dude and the Zen Master
 Most Dangerous Man: Walter White vs Rick Grimes
 Hottest "A(l)lison": Alison Brie vs Allison Williams
 Brotherly Love: The Dixon Brothers (Daryl and Merle) vs The Harbaugh Brothers (Jim and John)
 Jean-Claude Gahd Dam: Ronda Rousey vs Danai Gurira
 Best Lincoln: Abraham Lincoln vs Abraham Lincoln the Vampire Hunter
 Woman of the Year: Jennifer Lawrence

2014 Awards
The 2014 event was once again held at the Sony Studios in Culver City, California on June 7 and aired on Spike on June 11. Raphael Saadiq served as the musical performer.

 Guy of the Year: Matthew McConaughey
 Hottest Couple: Key & Peele
 Biggest Ass Kicker: Norman Reedus
 Guycon: Johnny Knoxville
 Holy Grail of Hot: Chrissy Teigen, Nina Agdal and Lily Aldridge
 Smartacus: Chris Hardwick
 Our New Girlfriend: Emily Ratajkowski
 Primetime: Andy Samberg
 King of Comedy: Kevin Hart
 Troops Choice for Entertainer of the Year: Mark Wahlberg
 Decade of Hotness: Sandra Bullock
 Rookie of the Year: Eddie Lacy vs Matt Harvey
 Jean-Claud Gahd Dam: Eva Green vs Lauren Cohan
 Outstanding Literary Achievement: Nick Offerman, "Paddle Your Own Canoe: One Man's Fundamentals for Delicious Living" vs Grumpy Cat, "Grumpy Cat: A Grumpy Book"
 Brotherly Love: The Robertsons (Phil, Si and Willie)  vs The Wahlbergs (Mark, Donnie and Paul)
 Most Dangerous Man: Daryl Dixon vs Raymond "Red" Reddington
 Hottest Emma: Emma Watson vs Emma Stone
 Most Desirable Woman: Rihanna

2015 Awards
The 2015 event aired on June 18 at 9/8c on Spike with Terrence Howard and Taraji P. Henson hosting the event, making it the first time since 2008 the show included a host. PPL MVR served as the house band. The show was taped on June 6, 2015 at the Sony Pictures Studios in Culver City, California and aired on Spike on June 18 at 9/8c. Unlike the previous awards, the 2015 event presented the honorees.

Guy of the Year: Chris Pratt
Jean-Claude Ghad Dam: Taraji P. Henson
Biggest Ass Kicker: Liam Neeson
Top Fantasy Leaguer: Russell Westbrook
Our New Girlfriend: Hannah Davis
G.O.A.T: LL Cool J
Hero: Dwayne Johnson
Decade of Hotness: Salma Hayek
Brass Balls: Sir Ben Kingsley
The Best Ever: Floyd Mayweather Jr.
Guycon: Jake Gyllenhaal
Funniest M.F.: Chelsea Handler
Most Dangerous Man: Terrence Howard

2016 Awards

References

External links

American film awards
2000s American television specials
Awards established in 2007
2007 American television series debuts
2010s American television specials
Spike (TV network) original programming